East Dublin may refer to:

 The U.S. city of East Dublin, Georgia
 The eastern part of Dublin, Ireland
 A nickname of Liverpool, England